Pool Hayes Academy is a mixed secondary school and sixth form located in Willenhall, in the West Midlands of England. It is one of the biggest secondary schools in the Metropolitan Borough of Walsall.

Buildings

Construction of the school began in the early 1960s. Pool Hayes Farm was levelled and a nearby pool plus Pool Hayes Colliery were filled in to make way for the school. Patricks Lane was renamed 'Pool Hayes Lane' and was redeveloped in 1965. The school itself was opened in 1964 around the same time as construction of the surrounding areas (including housing), was still in progress.

During 2006 the school came under partial redevelopment. The original 40-years old wooden windows were removed and replaced by new PVC framed windows. The I.T block was also redeveloped along with the tennis court, plus automatic doors replaced the original 60s wooden ones in the reception area. The maths section was altered as part of the redevelopment, with the two original doors either side being bricked over and replaced with a main door, which faces the grassy area.

School performance and inspection judgements

As of 2022, the school's most recent inspection by Ofsted was in 2022, with a judgement of Good.

Headteachers

 First: Harold Chamings
 Second: Ian Lancaster
 Third: Peter Mitchell
 Fourth: Jim Clarke, retired 2013
 Fifth: Matthew Allman, 2013 to 2016
 Sixth: Luke Baker, 2016 to 2018
 Seventh: Ms P. Harris, 2018 to 2021
 Eighth: Mr T. McDowall, 2021 to present

Specialist status

In September 2006, Pool Hayes was designated a Specialist Status as an Arts College which brought an increase in resources to support Drama, Music Technology and Creative Technology. This Specialist Status also carries with it the challenge of raising standards in those subjects throughout the school.

Academisation

Previously administered by Walsall Metropolitan Borough Council, in February 2016 Pool Hayes Arts and Community School was converted to academy status, and was renamed Pool Hayes Academy. The school is now part of the Academy Transformation Trust, but continues to coordinate with Walsall Metropolitan Borough Council for admissions.

Notable former pupils
 Mark Davies, footballer with Wolverhampton Wanderers and Bolton Wanderers.

References

External links
 Official School Website

Secondary schools in Walsall
Academies in Walsall
Specialist arts colleges in England